The TCR Asia Series is an annual touring car racing event that is held at various locations across Asia.

History
TCR Asia Series was announced on 14 August 2014 by the organisation behind the TCR series under the name TC3 Asia Series - later changed to TCR Asia Series along with the other announced series. David Sonenscher, boss of the company Motorsport Asia, will be maintaining the series. He has previously run the Asian Touring Car Series and the Porsche Carrera Cup Asia. Initially seven races were planned for 2015, but later were reduced to 5 and the final calendar was with 4. The Singapore and Thailand rounds were run together with the TCR International Series, while the rest supported the GT Asia Series calendar.

Champions

References

External links 
 

TCR Series
TCR